The 2011 Saginaw Sting season was the 3rd season for the Ultimate Indoor Football League (UIFL) franchise. After not faring well during their only season in the IFL, the Sting  For the 2011 season, the team was purchased by San Diego-based business man, Mike Esposito. Esposito announced that the team would play in the newly formed Ultimate Indoor Football League, which Esposito was also the league's commissioner. He hired Stuart Schweigert as the Sting's Director of Player Development. After a 2-1 start, John Mize was fired for failing to submit a game roster before the Wednesday night deadline, causing the Sting to play a game short handed, that they eventually lost 37-38. He was replaced by assistant coach Vince Leveille. The Sting went on to win the Ultimate Bowl, with quarterback Tommy Jones setting several UIFL passing records and claiming the Ultimate Bowl's MVP honors. Ultimate Indoor Football League franchise. The Sting were able to finish the season with a 10-4 record, and won the Ultimate Bowl over the Eastern Kentucky Drillers.

Schedule
Key:

Regular season

Postseason schedule

Standings

Final roster

Coaching staff
Head coach - Vince Leveille, Michigan Tech 
Tommy Jones - Offensive coordinator, Indiana University 
Paul Mattey - Offensive and defensive line, Quincy University 
Terry Foster - Defensive coordinator - Michigan Tech 
Fred Townsend - Assistant coach, Central Michigan University 
Billy Maxy - Assistant coach, Saginaw 
Caroline Kinsey - Legal counsel, Michigan State University

References

Saginaw Sting
Saginaw Sting
Saginaw Sting